WrestleFest may refer to:

 Terry Funk's WrestleFest, a 1997 professional wrestling event.
 WWF WrestleFest, a 1991 professional wrestling arcade game.